"Inside Your Heart" is the second single of J-pop duo FictionJunction Yuuka. It was released on July 27, 2004.

This single included the ending and one of the two insert songs for the anime Madlax, both composed by Yuki Kajiura.  Its catalog number is VICL-35646.

This single debuted at #22 on the Oricon Weekly Charts and had 6 weeks on charts.

Track listing 
  Inside Your Heart
  I'm Here

References

External links 
Victor Animation Network: discography entry

2004 singles
FictionJunction Yuuka songs
Madlax
Songs written by Yuki Kajiura
2004 songs
Victor Entertainment singles